Flytunes LLC was an Internet radio aggregator service founded by Roy Smith. It was developed for iPhone and iPod Touch and displays a list of Internet radio stations.

Partnership 
On April 14, 2008, Flytunes LLC. CEO Sam Abadir announced in a press release that they will be partnering with Accuradio and it will bring more than 320+ radio channels to iPhone and iPod.

Current Status 
Flytunes LLC was acquired by Wheon LLC on March 19, 2018. and the domain flytunes.fm redirects to Wheon's website. and now its a subsidiary of Wheon LLC.

References 

IOS software